The following is a list of churches in Anglesey.

Map of medieval parish churches 
Some of these may have been chapels of ease.

Active churches 
There is no online register of churches belonging to the Union of Welsh Independents, so the only source for UWI churches is the Coflein (historic buildings) register, at which point it becomes impossible to distinguish open from closed UWI churches.

The council area has an estimated 169 to 200 active churches for 69,700 inhabitants, a ratio of one church to every 349 to 412 inhabitants.

Defunct churches

References 

Anglesey